The 2011 Big West Conference Tournament will be the postseason tournament of the Big West Conference to determine the Big West Conference's champion and automatic berth into the 2011 NCAA Division I Men's Soccer Championship.

See also 
 Big West Conference
 2011 Big West Conference men's soccer season
 2011 in American soccer
 2011 NCAA Division I Men's Soccer Championship
 2011 NCAA Division I men's soccer season

References 

Big West Conference